Jacob Straus House, also known as the Louis Levy House, is a historic home located at Ligonier, Noble County, Indiana. It was built in 1898–1899, and is a two-story, frame dwelling with Neoclassical and Colonial Revival style design elements. It has a truncated hipped roof with dormers. The front facade features a two-story pedimented portico with Ionic order columns and pilasters. Also on the property is a contributing complementary garage. It is open to visitors by the Ligonier Historical Museum.

It was listed on the National Register of Historic Places in 1979. It is located in the Ligonier Historic District.

References

Historic house museums in Indiana
Houses on the National Register of Historic Places in Indiana
Neoclassical architecture in Indiana
Colonial Revival architecture in Indiana
Houses completed in 1899
Buildings and structures in Noble County, Indiana
National Register of Historic Places in Noble County, Indiana
Individually listed contributing properties to historic districts on the National Register in Indiana